Mount Ptolemy is the highest mountain of the Crowsnest Range and is located on the Continental Divide of the Americas along the provincial borders of Alberta and British Columbia. It was named in 1914 by Arthur O. Wheeler for its resemblance to a man sitting with folded arms. The mountain has also been known as Mummy Mountain.

See also
 List of peaks on the Alberta–British Columbia border
 Mountains of Alberta
 Mountains of British Columbia

References

Two-thousanders of Alberta
Two-thousanders of British Columbia
Canadian Rockies